Tiovivo c. 1950 is a 2004 Spanish film directed by José Luis Garci and starring Elsa Pataky, María Adánez and Carlos Hipólito.

The film was nominated for six Goya Awards in 2005, and won the award for Best Production Design.

Plot
Set in Madrid in the years after the Second World War, the film offers a nostalgic vision of a city managing to sustain entertainment, hope and love in the face of post-war hardship.

Cast
Elsa Pataky as Balbina
María Adánez as Catalana
Carlos Hipólito as Liebre
Francisco Algora as Povedano
Fernando Fernán Gómez as Tertuliano
Agustín González as Ramón
Ángel de Andrés López as Acisclo
Aurora Bautista as Anunciada
Fernando Guillén Cuervo as Higinio
Alfredo Landa as Eusebio
Carlos Larrañaga as Marcelino
Francis Lorenzo as Paco
Luisa Martín as Laurita
Andrés Pajares as Romualdo
Antonio Dechent as José Pedro Cervantes

See also
 List of Spanish films of 2004

External links
 

2004 films
2000s Spanish-language films
2004 comedy films
Films with screenplays by José Luis Garci
Spanish comedy films
Films directed by José Luis Garci
2000s Spanish films